John Fuller FRSL (born 1 January 1937) is an English poet and author, and Fellow Emeritus at Magdalen College, Oxford.

Biography
Fuller was born at Ashford, Kent, United Kingdom, the son of poet and Oxford Professor Roy Fuller, and educated at St Paul's School and New College, Oxford.

He began teaching in 1962 at the State University of New York, then continued at the University of Manchester. From 1966 to 2002 he was a Fellow and tutor of Magdalen College, Oxford; he is now Fellow Emeritus.

Fuller has published 15 collections of poetry, including Stones and Fires (1996), Now and for a Time (2002), Song and Dance (2008) and the recent The Dice Cup (2014). Chatto and Windus published a Collected Poems in 1996. His novel Flying to Nowhere (1983), a historical fantasy, won the Whitbread First Novel Award, and was nominated for the Booker Prize. In 1996 he won the Forward Prize for Stones and Fires and in 2006 the Michael Braude Award for Light Verse. He has also written collections of short stories and several books for children.  His poem  Ship of Sounds, illustrated with a wood engraving by the artist Garrick Palmer, was published in 1981 in an edition of 130 by The Gruffyground Press.

In 1968, John Fuller established the Sycamore Press, which he ran from his garage. The Sycamore Press published some of the most influential and critically acclaimed poets of the latter half of the twentieth century, such as W. H. Auden, Philip Larkin and Peter Porter. In addition to these established authors, the Press sought to promote younger poets, many of whom have gone on to achieve great success. The Sycamore Press ceased operations in 1992, and is an excellent example of a British small press, publishing for motives other than profit. John Fuller and the Sycamore Press (Bodleian Library, 2010) includes an interview with John Fuller and personal reflections by Sycamore Press authors about Fuller, the press and the works it produced. The book also includes a bibliography of the pamphlets and broadsides Fuller produced.

Fuller is a Fellow of the Royal Society of Literature.

Poetry
Fairground Music (Chatto & Windus, 1961)
The Tree that Walked (Chatto & Windus, 1967; Poetry Book Society Choice)
Cannibals and Missionaries (Secker & Warburg, 1972)
Epistles to Several Persons (Secker & Warburg, 1973; Geoffrey Faber Memorial Prize)
The Mountain and the Sea (Secker & Warburg, 1975)
Lies and Secrets (Secker & Warburg, 1979)
The Illusionists (Secker & Warburg, 1980; Southern Arts Literature Prize) 
Waiting for the Music (Salamander Press, 1982)
The Beautiful Inventions (Secker and Warburg, 1983; Poetry Book Society Choice)
Selected Poems 1954 to 1982 (Secker & Warburg, 1985, and Penguin Books, 1986)
Partingtime Hall (with James Fenton, Salamander Press, 1987, and Penguin Books, 1989)
Pillow Talk
The Grey Among the Green
The Mechanical Body
Stones and Fires (1996)
Now and for a Time (2002)
Collected Poems
The Solitary Life (Clutag Press, 2005)
The Space of Joy (2006)
Song and Dance (2008)
The Dice Cup (2014)

Fiction
Flying to Nowhere (1983), winner of the  Costa Book Awards First Novel and nominated for the Booker Prize)
The Adventures of Speedfall (1985)
Tell It Me Again (1988)
The Burning Boys (1989)
Look Twice (1991)
The Worm and the Star (1993)
A Skin Diary (1997)
The Memoirs of Laetitia Horsepole (2001)
Loser (2020)

Criticism
A Reader's Guide to W. H. Auden (1970)
The Sonnet
W. H. Auden: A Commentary (1998)
Who is Ozymandias? and other puzzles in poetry (2011)

For children
Herod Do Your Worst (1968)
Squeaking Crust (1970)
The Spider Monkey Uncle King
The Last Bid
The Extraordinary Wool Mill and other stories (1980)
Come Aboard and Sail Away
You're Having Me On! (2014)

As editor
The Chatto Book of Love Poetry
The Dramatic Works of John Gay
The Oxford Book of Sonnets
W. H. Auden

Further reading
 Ryan Roberts, John Fuller and the Sycamore Press: a bibliographic history (2010)

References

External links
 Johnny Fuller website
 Review and bibliography of “John Fuller and the Sycamore Press” by Ryan Roberts
 
 Aurélien Saby, "John Fuller: A Revolutionary Poet? An Interview with the Author of The Bone Flowers (2016)", Études britanniques contemporaines, 56, 2019. DOI : https://doi.org/10.4000/ebc.6706.

 Lidia Vianu, Interview published in Desperado Essay-Interviews, Editura Universitatii din Bucuresti, 2006

1937 births
Living people
Academics of the Victoria University of Manchester
Alumni of New College, Oxford
English male poets
English poets
Fellows of Magdalen College, Oxford
Fellows of the Royal Society of Literature
People from Ashford, Kent
State University of New York faculty